Amata creobota is a moth of the subfamily Arctiinae. It was described by William Jacob Holland in 1893. It is found in the Republic of the Congo and Gabon.

References

 

creobota
Moths described in 1893
Moths of Africa